Akropoli is a station on Athens Metro Line 2.
The station has a ticket office and three automatic ticket machines.

The station is decorated by huge posters of Melina Merkouri and reproductions of the Elgin Marbles of Parthenon.

History
The station appeared in the original Athens Metro plan which was funded in 1991 and when construction began it was to be named Olympieion. During construction the name was changed to its current name. The station opened on 15 November 2000 along with the Syntagma-Dafni extension, 10 months after the first section of the system opened.

Entrances
There are two entrances / exits to the station. One in Makrygianni street and one in Athanasiou Diakou street. Nor of the two entrances is ADA accessible. There is a third ADA accessible elevator-only entrance located further south on Makrygianni street.

Gallery

References

Athens Metro stations
Railway stations opened in 2000
2000 establishments in Greece